Sir Nathaniel Curzon, 4th Baronet (1676–1758) of Kedleston Hall, Derbyshire was an English Tory politician who represented three constituencies in the 18th century. 

Curzon was the son of Sir Nathaniel Curzon, 2nd Baronet of Kedleston, and his wife Sarah Penn, daughter of William Penn of Penn, Buckinghamshire.

Curzon was elected as Member of Parliament for Derby in 1713, but lost the seat in 1715. He was then elected for Clitheroe in 1722. When his elder unmarried brother John died in 1727, he inherited the baronetcy and Kedleston Hall. In the 1727 general election he retained his brother's parliamentary seat for Derbyshire, which he held until 1754.

Curzon married Mary Assheton, daughter of Sir Ralph Assheton, 2nd Baronet, of Middleton, Lancashire. On his death in 1758, his elder son, Nathaniel Curzon, succeeded to the baronetcy and was later made 1st Baron Scarsdale in 1761. His second son, Assheton Curzon, was  made 1st Baron Curzon in 1794 and later 1st Viscount Curzon in 1802.

References

1676 births
1758 deaths
Baronets in the Baronetage of England
Baronets in the Baronetage of Nova Scotia
Members of the Parliament of Great Britain for constituencies in Derbyshire
Members of the Parliament of Great Britain for English constituencies
Nathaniel
British MPs 1713–1715
British MPs 1722–1727
British MPs 1727–1734
British MPs 1734–1741
British MPs 1741–1747
British MPs 1747–1754